The 52nd edition of the Femina Miss India beauty pageant finale was held at Yash Raj Films Studios, Mumbai on March 28, 2015. The pageant was telecast on Colors TV and Zoom (TV channel). Twenty-one contestants competed during the pageant. Koyal Rana crowned Aditi Arya as her successor, while Aafreen Vaz and Vartika Singh were crowned 1st and 2nd Runners Up respectively.

Aditi Arya represented India at Miss World 2015 held in China . Aafreen Vaz represented India at Miss Supranational 2015 held in Poland, where she placed in the Top 10 and was crowned Miss Supranational Asia and Oceania 2015.

Final results
Color keys

Special awards
 Special Awards won by contestants.

Body Beautiful

National Costume

Best Talent

Miss Multimedia

Judges

Sub-Contest Judges
 Dino Morea - Gladrags Manhunt India 1995 and 1st Runner Up Manhunt International 1995, Model and Bollywood Actor.
 Gavin Miguel - Indian Designer
 Falguni Peacock - Indian Designer
 Shane Peacock - Indian Designer
 Vikram Bawa - Photographer

Final
 Shilpa Shetty - Actress
 Chitrangada Singh - Actress
 Sonali Bendre - Actress
 Manisha Koirala - Actress
 Sonu Nigam - Singer
 Abu Jani - Fashion designer
 Sandeep Khosla - Fashion designer 
 Anil Kapoor - Actor
 John Abraham - Actor
 Firoz A. Nadiadwala - Producer

Finalists

City Pageant Winners
 Winners of the City Pageants will get a direct entry to fbb Femina Miss India 2015.

Femina Miss India Delhi
 Femina Miss India Delhi winners

Femina Miss India Kolkata

Campus Princess

Crossovers

 Miss Diva
 2013 - Sushrii Shreya Mishraa (Top 7, Miss Digital)
 2014 - Vartika Singh (Top 7, Miss Photogenic)
 2014 - Chahat Dalal
 2015 - Naveli Deshmukh (2nd Runner Up)
 2017 - Apeksha Porwal (Runner Up)
 2019 - Vartika Singh  Miss Universe India
 2021 - Naveli Deshmukh

 New Zealand's Next Top Model
 2010 - Aafreen Rachael Vaz (Eliminated episode 4)
 I Am She - Miss Universe India
 2010 - Sushrii Shreya Mishraa (I AM Popular)
 Asian Supermodel India
 2010 - Sushrii Shreya Mishraa (Winner)
 Senorita India
 2016 - Rewati Chetri (Winner, Senorita India Miss International India)

References

2015
2015 beauty pageants in India